San Marco is a religious complex in Florence, Italy. It comprises a church and a convent. The convent, which is now the Museo Nazionale di San Marco, has three claims to fame. During the 15th century it was home to two famous Dominicans, the painter Fra Angelico and the preacher Girolamo Savonarola. Furthermore, the church houses the tomb of Pico Della Mirandola, Renaissance philosopher and so called father of humanism.

History

Sylvestrines

The present convent occupies the site where a Sylvestrine monastery existed in the 13th century, which later passed to the Sylvestrine monks. The church was used both for monastic liturgical functions and as a parish church.

From this initial period there have recently been rediscovered some traces of frescoes below floor level. In 1418 the Sylvestrines, accused of laxity in their observance of the Rule, were pressured to leave, but it took a direct intervention of Pope Eugene IV and the Council of Basel before finally in 1437 the buildings were vacated at San Marco and passed to observant Dominicans coming from the Convent of San Domenico, Fiesole. A decisive element was the intervention of Cosimo de' Medici the Elder, who since 1420 had already shown his support for the reformed Franciscan convent of Bosco ai Frati and from his return from exile in 1434 had made clear his desire to see an observant community of Dominicans established in Florence. When the Sylvestrines left, moving to the smaller monastery of San Giorgio alla Costa, Dominican friars took over the San Marco buildings, which were in a poor condition and for two years or so were obliged to live in damp cells or wooden huts. They appealed to Cosimo de' Medici the Elder, who lived nearby in the family palace, now known as the Palazzo Medici-Riccardi, to fund the renovation of the entire complex.

Medici reconstruction

In 1437 Cosimo commissioned Michelozzo, the Medici family's favourite architect, to rebuild the San Marco convent on Renaissance lines. By 1438 the work was well underway and the final dedication took place on Epiphany night 1443 in the presence of Pope Eugene IV and the Archbishop of Capua, cardinal Niccolò d'Acciapaccio. San Marco became one of the main elements in the new configuration of the area to the North of the centre of Florence (the so-called “Medici quartiere”), along with the Medici family palazzo and the basilica of San Lorenzo. These years marked the height of the Medici family's artistic patronage, above all in connection with the transfer to Florence of the Ecumenical Council from Ferrara to Florence in 1439. Michelozzo succeeded in developing an architectural model for the renaissance library. It included a long narrow hall, divided into three parts by two rows of plain columns.

According to Giorgio Vasari’s Lives of the Most Excellent Painters, Sculptors, and Architects, Cosimo invested in the new convent a notable amount of finance, amounting to some 40,000 florins. Michelozzo worked on San Marco from 1439 to 1444.

Church
The church has a single nave with side chapels designed in the late 16th century by Giambologna, and housing paintings from the 16th–17th centuries. In the late 17th century the tribune and the carved ceiling were also realized. A further renovation was carried on in 1678 by Pier Francesco Silvani. The façade, in Neo-Classical style, was built in 1777–1778.

Among the artworks, the most ancient is a 14th-century crucifix in the counter-façade. The crucifix on the high altar (1425–1428) is by Fra Angelico. Over the first altar to the right is St. Thomas Praying by Santi di Tito from 1593, while over the second altar is a Madonna with Saints by Fra Bartolomeo.

Giambologna completed the Cappella di Sant'Antonino (also known as Salviati Chapel) in May 1589. The Salviati family had been linked by marriage to the Medici (Pope Leo XI was the son of Francesca Salviati, the daughter of Giacomo Salviati and Lucrezia de' Medici).
The interior was decorated in fresco with a Translation and Funeral of St. Antonino Perozzi by Domenico Passignano. The dome of the chapel is by Bernardino Poccetti, also author of frescoes in the Sacrament Chapel. The latter also has canvases by Santi di Tito, Crespi, Francesco Morandini, Jacopo da Empoli, and Francesco Curradi.

Convent

The work was planned according to arrangements that took account of simplicity and practicality, but were of great elegance: a sober, though comfortable, Renaissance edifice. The internal walls were covered in whitewashed plaster, layout centred on two cloisters (named after Saint Antoninus and Saint Dominic), with the usual conventual features of a chapter house, two refectories and guest quarters on the ground level. On the upper floor were the friars’ cells, small walled enclosures overarched by a single trussed roof. The cloisters, chapter house and dorters (or dormitories), in the form described, must have been finished by 1440–1441. The South dormitory, which overlooks Piazza San Marco, was completed in 1442. Work on the rest of the convent went on until 1452.

Cosimo de' Medici had a cell in the convent, adjacent to those of the friars, for his personal retreat. These cells of the friars' dorter or dormitory, including that of Cosimo, and many other walls were decorated by Fra Angelico in collaboration with others, including Benozzo Gozzoli.

An outstanding feature of the convent is the library on the first floor.

Savonarola era

In addition to Fra Angelico, Antonino Pierozzi and Fra Bartolomeo, San Marco was the home from 1489 onwards of the friar Girolamo Savonarola. Having become prior of the convent, the latter unleashed a fierce campaign against the Florentines’ morals and their ostentation of luxury. He was to fall foul of the court of Pope Alexander VI Borgia and ended his life burnt at the stake in front of the Palazzo della Signoria in 1498.

Recent times

The convent was stripped from the Dominicans in 1808, during the Napoleonic Wars, and again in 1866, when it became a possession of the state.

Until recently San Marco still housed a community of Dominican friars, who occupied the Western part of the complex adjacent to the larger cloister. In 2014 the few friars remaining were transferred to join the community at Santa Maria Novella in the city.

The convent is now home to the Museo Nazionale di San Marco. The entrance to the museum is from the so-called Cloister of St. Antoninus, decorated with frescoes by Bernardino Poccetti in the 16th–17th century.

References

External links